Notable synthesizer manufacturers past and present include:

A 
 Access Music
 Alesis
 ARP
 Arturia
 Akai

B 
 Behringer
 Buchla and Associates

C 
 Casio
 Clavia
 Crumar

D 
 Dave Smith Instruments
 Dewtron
 Doepfer

E 
 Electro-Harmonix (Micro Synthesizer)
 Electronic Dream Plant
 Electronic Music Studios (EMS)
 Elektron
 Elka
 E-mu
 Ensoniq

F 
 Fairlight
 Farfisa
 Formanta (Polivoks)
 Future Retro

G 
 Generalmusic
 Gleeman

K 
 Kawai
 Korg
 Kurzweil

M 
 M-Audio (formerly Midiman)
 Moog Music

N 
 Native Instruments
 New England Digital (NED)
 Novation

O 
 Oberheim

P 
 PAiA Electronics
 Palm Products GmbH (PPG)

Q 
 Quasimidi

R 
 Roland

S 
 Sequential
 Siel
 Spectrasonics
 Studio Electronics
 Synthesizers.com

T 
 Technics
 Teenage Engineering
 Teisco

W 
 Waldorf Music

Y 
 Yamaha

Modulars

 Doepfer Musikelektronik (A-100)
 Synthesizers.com

Synthesizer manufacturers
 
Synthesizer